Emelia Yassir (born 25 September 2003) is an Australian rules footballer playing for the Richmond Football Club in the AFL Women's (AFLW). Yassir was drafted by Richmond with their second selection and sixteenth overall in the 2021 AFL Women's draft. She made her debut against  at RSEA Park in the first round of the 2022 season.

Statistics
Statistics are correct to round 2, 2022

|- style="background-color: #eaeaea"
! scope="row" style="text-align:center" | 2022
|style="text-align:center;"|
| 27 || 1 || 0 || 0 || 3 || 4 || 7 || 1 || 3 || 0 || 0 || 3 || 4 || 7 || 1 || 3
|- 
|- class="sortbottom"
! colspan=3| Career
! 1
! 0
! 0
! 3
! 4
! 7
! 1
! 3
! 0
! 0
! 3
! 4
! 7
! 1
! 3
|}

References

External links
 
 

2003 births
Living people
Richmond Football Club (AFLW) players
Australian rules footballers from Victoria (Australia)